Canby's Cross is located in Lava Beds National Monument, about 3 miles south of Tule Lake, and 5 miles south-southwest of the town of Tulelake, California. It was erected to commemorate General Canby's death at a peace gathering.  General Canby was shot in the face by Captain Jack of the Modoc tribe, who was later hanged for the killing. The cross is registered as a California Historical Landmark.

The cross reads: Gen Canby USA was murdered here by the Modocs April 11, 1873.

The elevation of Canby's Cross is 4058 ft (1237 m).

References

External links

Modoc War
Lava Beds National Monument